Larbre Compétition is a French auto racing team founded in 1988 by Jack Leconte.  Based at the Circuit du Val de Vienne in Le Vigeant, Larbre has had considerable success in the Porsche Carrera Cup, French GT Championship, and international FIA GT Championship.  Previously working with major automobile manufacturers like Porsche, Ferrari, and Chrysler, Larbre ran one of the factory Aston Martin squads in the Le Mans Series where they won the 2006 GT1 class championship.

For 2008 Larbre chose to enlist Saleen S7-Rs for the Le Mans Series and FFSA GT Championship. The team continued with the GT1 Saleens during the 2009 LMS season, but ACO denied an entry from them for the 2009 24 Hours of Le Mans.

For 2010 Larbre competed once again with the 10-year-old Saleen S7-R in the Le Mans Series, with drivers Fernando Rees, Gabriele Gardel and Patrice Goueslard.  In 2010 24 Hours of Le Mans the team took the last LMGT1 class win with the aging Saleen S7-R, as well championship victories from both Le Mans Series and Intercontinental Le Mans Cup.

In 2011 the GT1 class got axed from ACO-sanctioned racing, and the old GT2 category (renamed as GTE) became the premier GT class. The team entered a Chevrolet Corvette C6.R into the GTE-Am division of the Le Mans Series and 24 Hours of Le Mans. The team won the GTE-Am category of the 2011 24 Hours of Le Mans with the Corvette and also took the second place with Porsche GT3 RSR. They also won the ILMC GTE-AM championship and thus became the first team to win a professional championship with a GT2-spec Corvette C6.R.

In 2012 and 2013, Larbre competed in the FIA World Endurance Championship with two GTE-Am class Corvette C6.Rs.

For 2014, Larbre competed in the first race of the European Le Mans Series season, the 4 Hours of Silverstone, with Keiko Ihara and Gustavo Yacamán driving a Morgan LMP2. The team also competed in the 24 Hours of Le Mans as an ELMS entry with the addition of Ricky Taylor.

For 2015, Larbre is currently competing with a Chevrolet Corvette C7.R in the GTE-Am class of the FIA World Endurance Championship with drivers Gianluca Roda, Paolo Ruberti, Kristian Poulsen, and Nicolai Sylvest. The team continues in the FIA World Endurance Championship in 2016, again with a Corvette C7.R racing in GTE-Am. The driver lineup consists of Yatuka Yamagishi, Pierre Ragues, and Paolo Ruberti.

Achievements
 24 Hours of Le Mans
1993 - LMGT class winner Porsche 911 Carrera RSR
1994 - LMGTS class winner Porsche 911 Carrera RSR
2010 - LMGT1 class winner Saleen S7-R
2011 - LMGTE-AM class winner Chevrolet Corvette C6.R GT2
2012 - LMGTE-AM class winner Chevrolet Corvette C6.R GT2

 FIA GT Championship
2000 - N-GT class team champion Porsche 911 GT3-R
2001 - GT class team champion Chrysler Viper GTS-R
2002 - GT class team champion Chrysler Viper GTS-R

 Spa 24 Hours
2001 - Overall winner Chrysler Viper GTS-R
2002 - Overall winner Chrysler Viper GTS-R

 Le Mans Series
2004 - LMGTS class team champion Ferrari 550-GTS Maranello
2006 - LMGT1 class team champion Aston Martin DBR9
2010 - LMGT1 class team champion Saleen S7-R

 Intercontinental Le Mans Cup
2010 - LMGT1 class team champion Saleen S7-R
2011 - LMGTE-AM class champion Chevrolet Corvette C6.R GT2

 Championat de France FFSA GT
 1997 Champion de France FFSA GT Porsche GT2
 2003 Champion de France FFSA GT Chrysler Viper
 2008 Champion de France FFSA GT Saleen S7-R
 2010 Champion de France FFSA GT Porsche 911 GT3

External links
 

French auto racing teams
Auto racing teams established in 1988
1988 establishments in France
24 Hours of Le Mans teams
European Le Mans Series teams
FIA GT Championship teams
FIA World Endurance Championship teams
Porsche Supercup teams
American Le Mans Series teams